Little Glemham is a small village on the A12 road, in the East Suffolk district, in the county of Suffolk, England. The population of the parish at the 2011 Census was 187. Nearby settlements include the villages of Wickham Market and Marlesford. Little Glemham has a church, St. Andrew's, a pub and a hall called Glemham Hall. The corresponding village of Great Glemham is a few miles away.

References 

 Suffolk Churches

Villages in Suffolk
Civil parishes in Suffolk